Argonne National Laboratory is a federally funded research and development center in Lemont, Illinois, United States. Founded in 1946, the laboratory is now sponsored by the United States Department of Energy and administered by UChicago Argonne LLC of the University of Chicago. The facility is the largest national laboratory by size and scope in the Midwest.

Argonne had its beginnings in the Metallurgical Laboratory of the University of Chicago, formed in part to carry out Enrico Fermi's work on nuclear reactors for the Manhattan Project during World War II. After the war, it was designated as the first national laboratory in the United States on July 1, 1946. In the post-war era the lab focused primarily on non-weapon related nuclear physics, designing and building the first power-producing nuclear reactors, helping design the reactors used by the United States' nuclear navy, and a wide variety of similar projects. In 1994, the lab's nuclear mission ended, and although it continues to support many types of nuclear science and technology research, it also maintains a broad portfolio in basic science research, energy storage and renewable energy, environmental sustainability, supercomputing, and national security.

UChicago Argonne, LLC, the operator of the laboratory, "brings together the expertise of the University of Chicago (the sole member of the LLC) with Jacobs Engineering Group Inc." Argonne is a part of the expanding Illinois Technology and Research Corridor. Argonne formerly ran a smaller facility called Argonne National Laboratory-West (or simply Argonne-West) in Idaho next to the Idaho National Engineering and Environmental Laboratory. In 2005, the two Idaho-based laboratories merged to become the Idaho National Laboratory.

Overview
Argonne has five main areas of focus. These goals, as stated by the DOE in 2008, consist of:

 Conducting basic scientific research;
 Operating national scientific facilities;
 Enhancing the nation's energy resources;
 Developing better ways to manage environmental problems;
 Protecting national security.

History

What would become Argonne began in 1942 as the Metallurgical Laboratory at the University of Chicago, which had become part of the Manhattan Project. The Met Lab built Chicago Pile-1, the world's first nuclear reactor, under the stands of the University of Chicago sports stadium. Considered unsafe, in 1943, CP-1 was reconstructed as CP-2, in what is today known as Red Gate Woods but was then the Argonne Forest in the Forest Preserve District of Cook County  near Palos Hills. The lab was named after the surrounding forest, which in turn was named after the Forest of Argonne in France where U.S. troops fought in World War I.  Fermi's pile was originally going to be constructed in the Argonne forest, and construction plans were set in motion, but a labor dispute brought the project to a halt. Since speed was paramount, the project was moved to the squash court under Stagg Field, the football stadium on the campus of the University of Chicago. Fermi told them that he was sure of his calculations, which said that it would not lead to a runaway reaction, which would have contaminated the city.

Other activities were added to Argonne over the next five years. On July 1, 1946, the "Metallurgical Laboratory" was formally re-chartered as Argonne National Laboratory for "cooperative research in nucleonics." At the request of the U.S. Atomic Energy Commission, it began developing nuclear reactors for the nation's peaceful nuclear energy program. In the late 1940s and early 1950s, the laboratory moved to a larger location in unincorporated DuPage County, Illinois and established a remote location in Idaho, called "Argonne-West," to conduct further nuclear research.

In quick succession, the laboratory designed and built Chicago Pile 3 (1944), the world's first heavy-water moderated reactor, and the Experimental Breeder Reactor I (Chicago Pile 4), built-in Idaho, which lit a string of four light bulbs with the world's first nuclear-generated electricity in 1951. The BWR power station reactor, now the second most popular design worldwide, came from the BORAX experiments. A complete list of the reactors designed and, in most cases, built and operated by Argonne can be viewed on the "Reactors Designed by Argonne" page. 

The knowledge gained from the Argonne experiments conducted with these reactors 1) formed the foundation for the designs of most of the commercial reactors currently used throughout the world for electric power generation and 2) inform the current evolving designs of liquid-metal reactors for future commercial power stations.

Conducting classified research, the laboratory was heavily secured; all employees and visitors needed badges to pass a checkpoint, many of the buildings were classified, and the laboratory itself was fenced and guarded. Such alluring secrecy drew visitors both authorized—including King Leopold III of Belgium and Queen Frederica of Greece—and unauthorized. Shortly past 1 a.m. on February 6, 1951, Argonne guards discovered reporter Paul Harvey near the  perimeter fence, his coat tangled in the barbed wire. Searching his car, guards found a previously prepared four-page broadcast detailing the saga of his unauthorized entrance into a classified "hot zone". He was brought before a federal grand jury on charges of conspiracy to obtain information on national security and transmit it to the public, but was not indicted.

Not all nuclear technology went into developing reactors, however. While designing a scanner for reactor fuel elements in 1957, Argonne physicist William Nelson Beck put his own arm inside the scanner and obtained one of the first ultrasound images of the human body. Remote manipulators designed to handle radioactive materials laid the groundwork for more complex machines used to clean up contaminated areas, sealed laboratories or caves. In 1964, the "Janus" reactor opened to study the effects of neutron radiation on biological life, providing research for guidelines on safe exposure levels for workers at power plants, laboratories and hospitals.  Scientists at Argonne pioneered a technique to analyze the moon's surface using alpha radiation, which launched aboard the Surveyor 5 in 1967 and later analyzed lunar samples from the Apollo 11 mission.

In addition to nuclear work, the laboratory maintained a strong presence in the basic research of physics and chemistry. In 1955, Argonne chemists co-discovered the elements einsteinium and fermium, elements 99 and 100 in the periodic table. In 1962, laboratory chemists produced the first compound of the inert noble gas xenon, opening up a new field of chemical bonding research. In 1963, they discovered the hydrated electron.

High-energy physics made a leap forward when Argonne was chosen as the site of the 12.5 GeV Zero Gradient Synchrotron, a proton accelerator that opened in 1963. A bubble chamber allowed scientists to track the motions of subatomic particles as they zipped through the chamber; in 1970, they observed the neutrino in a hydrogen bubble chamber for the first time.

Meanwhile, the laboratory was also helping to design the reactor for the world's first nuclear-powered submarine, the U.S.S. Nautilus, which steamed for more than 513,550 nautical miles (951,090 km). The next nuclear reactor model was Experimental Boiling Water Reactor, the forerunner of many modern nuclear plants, and Experimental Breeder Reactor II (EBR-II), which was sodium-cooled, and included a fuel recycling facility. EBR-II was later modified to test other reactor designs, including a fast-neutron reactor and, in 1982, the Integral Fast Reactor concept—a revolutionary design that reprocessed its own fuel, reduced its atomic waste and withstood safety tests of the same failures that triggered the Chernobyl and Three Mile Island disasters. In 1994, however, the U.S. Congress terminated funding for the bulk of Argonne's nuclear programs.

Argonne moved to specialize in other areas, while capitalizing on its experience in physics, chemical sciences and metallurgy. In 1987, the laboratory was the first to successfully demonstrate a pioneering technique called plasma wakefield acceleration, which accelerates particles in much shorter distances than conventional accelerators. It also cultivated a strong battery research program.

Following a major push by then-director Alan Schriesheim, the laboratory was chosen as the site of the Advanced Photon Source, a major X-ray facility which was completed in 1995 and produced the brightest X-rays in the world at the time of its construction.

On 19 March 2019, it was reported in the Chicago Tribune that the laboratory was constructing the world's most powerful supercomputer. Costing $500 million it will have the processing power of 1 quintillion flops. Applications will include the analysis of stars and improvements in the power grid.

Directors
Over the course of its history, 13 individuals have served as Argonne Director:

 1946–1956 Walter Zinn
 1957–1961 Norman Hilberry
 1961–1967 Albert V. Crewe
 1967–1973 Robert B. Duffield
 1973–1979 Robert G. Sachs
 1979–1984 Walter E. Massey
 1984–1996 Alan Schriesheim
 1996–1998 Dean E. Eastman
 2000–2005 Hermann A. Grunder
 2005–2008 Robert Rosner
 2009–2014 Eric Isaacs
 2014–2016 Peter Littlewood
 2017–Present Paul Kearns

Initiatives

Hard X-ray Sciences: Argonne is home to one of the world's largest high-energy light sources: the Advanced Photon Source (APS). Each year, scientists make thousands of discoveries while using the APS to characterize both organic and inorganic materials and even processes, such as how vehicle fuel injectors spray gasoline in engines.
Leadership Computing: Argonne maintains one of the fastest computers for open science and has developed system software for these massive machines. Argonne works to drive the evolution of leadership computing from petascale to exascale, develop new codes and computing environments, and expand computational efforts to help solve scientific challenges. For example, in October 2009, the laboratory announced that it would be embarking on a joint project to explore cloud computing for scientific purposes. In the 1970s Argonne translated the Numerische Mathematik numerical linear algebra programs from ALGOL to Fortran and this library was expanded into LINPACK and EISPACK, by Cleve Moler, et al.
Materials for Energy: Argonne scientists work to predict, understand, and control where and how to place individual atoms and molecules to achieve desired material properties. Among other innovations, Argonne scientists helped develop an ice slurry to cool the organs of heart attack victims, described what makes diamonds slippery at the nanoscale level, and discovered a superinsulating material that resists the flow of electric current more completely than any other previous material.
Electrical Energy Storage: Argonne develops batteries for electric transportation technology and grid storage for intermittent energy sources like wind or solar, as well as the manufacturing processes needed for these materials-intensive systems.  The laboratory has been working on advanced battery materials research and development for over 50 years. In the past 10 years, the laboratory has focused on lithium-ion batteries, and in September 2009, it announced an initiative to explore and improve their capabilities. Argonne also maintains an independent battery-testing facility, which tests sample batteries from both government and private industry to see how well they perform over time and under heat and cold stresses.
Alternative Energy and Efficiency: Argonne develops both chemical and biological fuels tailored for current engines as well as improved combustion schemes for future engine technologies. The laboratory has also recommended best practices for conserving fuel; for example, a study that recommended installing auxiliary cab heaters for trucks in lieu of idling the engine. Meanwhile, the solar energy research program focuses on solar-fuel and solar-electric devices and systems that are scalable and economically competitive with fossil energy sources. Argonne scientists also explore best practices for a smart grid, both by modeling power flow between utilities and homes and by researching the technology for interfaces.
Nuclear Energy: Argonne generates advanced reactor and fuel cycle technologies that enable the safe, sustainable generation of nuclear power. Argonne scientists develop and validate computational models and reactor simulations of future generation nuclear reactors. Another project studies how to reprocess spent nuclear fuel, so that waste is reduced up to 90%.
Biological and Environmental Systems: Understanding the local effect of climate change requires integration of the interactions between the environment and human activities. Argonne scientists study these relationships from molecule to organism to ecosystem. Programs include bioremediation using trees to pull pollutants out of groundwater; biochips to detect cancers earlier; a project to target cancerous cells using nanoparticles; soil metagenomics; and a user facility for the Atmospheric Radiation Measurementclimate change research project.
National Security: Argonne develops security technologies that will prevent and mitigate events with potential for mass disruption or destruction. These include sensors that can detect chemical, biological, nuclear and explosive materials; portable Terahertz radiation ("T-ray") machines that detect dangerous materials more easily than X-rays at airports; and tracking and modeling the possible paths of chemicals released into a subway.

User facilities

Argonne builds and maintains scientific facilities that would be too expensive for a single company or university to construct and operate. These facilities are used by scientists from Argonne, private industry, academia, other national laboratories and international scientific organizations.

Advanced Photon Source (APS): a national synchrotron X-ray research facility which produces the brightest X-ray beams in the Western Hemisphere.
Center for Nanoscale Materials (CNM): a user facility located on the APS which provides infrastructure and instruments to study nanotechnology and nanomaterials. The CNM is one of five U.S. Department of Energy Office of Science Nanoscale Science Research Centers.
Argonne Tandem Linac Accelerator System (ATLAS): ATLAS is the world's first superconducting particle accelerator for heavy ions at energies in the vicinity of the Coulomb barrier. This is the energy domain suited to study the properties of the nucleus, the core of matter and the fuel of stars.
Argonne Leadership Computing Facility (ALCF): a DOE Office of Science User Facility that provides supercomputing resources to the research community to enable breakthroughs in science and engineering.

Centers
The Advanced Materials for Energy-Water Systems (AMEWS) Center is an Energy Frontier Research Center sponsored by the U.S. Department of Energy. Led by Argonne National Laboratory and including the University of Chicago and Northwestern University as partners, AMEWS works to solve the challenges that exist at the interface of water and the materials that make up the systems that handle, process and treat water.
Electron Microscopy Center (EMC): one of three DOE-supported scientific user facilities for electron beam microcharacterization. The EMC conducts in situ studies of transformations and defect processes, ion beam modification and irradiation effects, superconductors, ferroelectrics and interfaces. Its intermediate voltage electron microscope, which is coupled with an accelerator, represents the only such system in the United States.
Biology Center (SBC): The SBC is a user facility located off the Advanced Photon Source X-ray facility, which specializes in macromolecular crystallography. Users have access to an insertion-device, a bending-magnet, and a biochemistry laboratory. SBC beamlines are often used to map out the crystal structures of proteins; in the past, users have imaged proteins from anthrax, meningitis-causing bacteria, salmonella, and other pathogenic bacteria.
The Network Enabled Optimization System (NEOS) Server is the first network-enabled problem-solving environment for a wide class of applications in business, science, and engineering. Included are state-of-the-art solvers in integer programming, nonlinear optimization, linear programming, stochastic programming, and complementarity problems. Most NEOS solvers accept input in the AMPL modeling language.
The Joint Center for Energy Storage Research (JCESR) is a consortium of several national laboratories, academic institutions, and industrial partners based at Argonne National Laboratory. The mission of JCESR is to design and build transformative materials enabling next-generation batteries that satisfy all the performance metrics for a given application.
The Midwest Integrated Center for Computational Materials (MICCoM) is headquartered at the laboratory. MICCoM develops and disseminates interoperable open-source software, data, and validation procedures to simulate and predict properties of functional materials for energy conversion processes.
The ReCell Center is a national collaboration of industry, academia and national laboratories, led by Argonne National Laboratory, working to advance recycling technologies along the entire battery life cycle. The center aims to grow a sustainable advanced battery recycling industry by developing economic and environmentally sound recycling processes that can be adopted by industry for lithium-ion and future battery chemistries.

Educational and community outreach

Argonne welcomes all members of the public age 16 or older to take guided tours of the scientific and engineering facilities and grounds.  For children under 16, Argonne offers hands-on learning activities suitable for K–12 field trips and scout outings. The laboratory also hosts educational science and engineering outreach for schools in the surrounding area.

Argonne scientists and engineers take part in the training of nearly 1,000 college graduate students and post-doctoral researchers every year as part of their research and development activities.

In media
Significant portions of the 1996 chase film Chain Reaction were shot in the Zero Gradient Synchrotron ring room and the former Continuous Wave Deuterium Demonstrator laboratory.

Notable staff

Alexei Alexeyevich Abrikosov
Khalil Amine
Margaret K. Butler
Paul Fenter
Stuart Freedman
Ian Foster
Wallace Givens
Raymond Goertz
Maury C. Goodman

Caroline Herzenberg
Paul Kearns
Maria Goeppert Mayer
William McCune
Carlo Montemagno
José Enrique Moyal
Gilbert Jerome Perlow
Aneesur Rahman
Luise Meyer-Schützmeister
Dorothy Martin Simon
Lynda Soderholm
Marius Stan
Rick Stevens
Valerie Taylor
 Joseph Thompson (security)
Marion C. Thurnauer
Kameshwar C. Wali
Larry Wos
Cosmas Zachos
Daniel Zajfman 
Nestor J. Zaluzec

See also
 Advanced Research Projects Agency-Energy
 Automated theorem proving
 Canadian Penning Trap Spectrometer
 Center for the Advancement of Science in Space—operates the US National Laboratory on the ISS.
 Gammasphere
 Nanofluid
 Track Imaging Cherenkov Experiment

Notes

References
 Argonne National Laboratory, 1946–96. Jack M. Holl, Richard G. Hewlett, Ruth R. Harris. University of Illinois Press, 1997. .
 Nuclear physics: an introduction. S.B. Patel. New Age International Ltd., 1991. .
 Summary of Nuclear Chemistry Work at Argonne, Martin H. Studier, Argonne National Laboratory Report, Declassified June 13, 1949.

External links

 Argonne National Laboratory—Official Argonne website
 Argonne National Laboratory Presentations—Finding aid for Argonne National Laboratory presentations
 Argonne News—News releases, media center
 Argonne Software—Open source and commercially available software in or near the "shrink-wrap" phase
 Photo repository—Photography for public use

 
United States Department of Energy national laboratories
Federally Funded Research and Development Centers
Buildings and structures in DuPage County, Illinois
Leadership in Energy and Environmental Design certified buildings
Lemont, Illinois
Nuclear research institutes
Supercomputer sites
University of Chicago
Tourist attractions in DuPage County, Illinois
Argonne National Laboratory people
1946 establishments in Illinois